3673 Levy, provisional designation , is a binary Flora asteroid from the inner regions of the asteroid belt, approximately 6 kilometers in diameter. It was discovered on 22 August 1985, by American astronomer Edward Bowell at Lowell's Anderson Mesa Station near Flagstaff, Arizona, United States. The asteroid was named after Canadian astronomer David H. Levy.

Classification and orbit 

The S-type asteroid is a member of the Flora family, one of the largest groups of stony asteroids in the main-belt. Levy orbits the Sun in the inner main-belt at a distance of 1.9–2.8 AU once every 3 years and 7 months (1,312 days). Its orbit has an eccentricity of 0.19 and an inclination of 7° with respect to the ecliptic. It was first identified as "" at Crimea–Nauchnij in 1969, extending its observation arc by 16 years prior to the official discovery observation.

Lightcurve 

In December 2007, astronomers from the U.S. Carbuncle Hill Observatory in Rhode Island, the Czech Ondřejov Observatory, and the Californian Goat Mountain Astronomical Research Station obtained a rotational lightcurve showing Levy to turn on its axis every 2.688 hours. The low brightness variation of 0.13 magnitude indicates that the body has a nearly spheroidal shape. During the photometric observations, it was also discovered that Levy is a binary asteroid, orbited every 21.67 hours by a satellite, which approximately measures  % of Levys diameter (1.8 kilometer).

Diameter and albedo 

According to the survey carried out by NASA's Wide-field Infrared Survey Explorer with its subsequent NEOWISE mission, Levy measures between 5.80 and 6.47 kilometers in diameter and its surface has an albedo between 0.234 and 0.398. The Collaborative Asteroid Lightcurve Link agrees with the revised WISE-results by Pravec and adopts an albedo of 0.2341 and a diameter of 6.47 kilometers with an absolute magnitude of 13.14.

Naming 

This minor planet was named in honor of Canadian astronomer David H. Levy (b. 1948), a discoverer of minor planets and comets and a highly committed observer, who uses a large repertoire of observational techniques. He is also an educator and author, known for his biographies of astronomers and for his launched educational programs, bringing observational astronomy to the broader public. The approved naming citation was published by the Minor Planet Center on 2 April 1988.

He is one of the most successful comet discoverers in history. He has discovered 22 comets, nine of them using his own backyard telescopes. With Eugene and Carolyn Shoemaker at the Palomar Observatory in California he discovered Shoemaker-Levy 9, the comet that collided with Jupiter in 1994. That episode produced the most spectacular explosions ever witnessed in the solar system. Levy is currently involved with the Jarnac Comet Survey, which is based at the Jarnac Observatory in Vail, Arizona, but which has telescopes planned for locations around the world.

Notes

References

External links 
 Asteroids with Satellites, Robert Johnston, johnstonsarchive.net
 Asteroid Lightcurve Database (LCDB), query form (info )
 Dictionary of Minor Planet Names, Google books
 Asteroids and comets rotation curves, CdR – Observatoire de Genève, Raoul Behrend
 Discovery Circumstances: Numbered Minor Planets (1)-(5000) – Minor Planet Center
 
 

003673
Discoveries by Edward L. G. Bowell
Named minor planets
003673
1985 in science
19850822